Alex Romero is a baseball outfielder.

Alex Romero may also refer to:

Alex Romero (American football)
Alex Romero (choreographer)
Alex Romero (character), a character from House of Cards